Clair or Claire may refer to:

Claire (given name), a list of people with the name Claire
Clair (surname)

Places

Canada 
 Clair, New Brunswick, a former village, now part of Haut-Madawaska
 Clair Parish, New Brunswick
 Pointe-Claire, Quebec, Canada, municipality located on the Island of Montreal
 Clair, Saskatchewan

United States 
 Lake Claire (Atlanta), Georgia, neighborhood
 Le Claire, Iowa, city in Scott County
 Eau Claire, Michigan, village in Berrien County
 Eau Claire, Pennsylvania, borough in Butler County
 Claire City, South Dakota, town in Roberts County
 Eau Claire, Wisconsin, city
 Eau Claire County, Wisconsin
 Saint Clair, Missouri, city
 St. Clair County, Michigan
 St. Clair, Michigan, city
 St. Clair, Minnesota, city
 St. Clair, Pennsylvania, city
 St. Clair Shores, Michigan, city

Scotland 
 Clair oilfield in the Atlantic Ocean, 75 km west of Shetland

Other uses 
 Clair (Hampshire cricketer), English professional cricketer
 "Clair" (song), a 1972 hit for Gilbert O'Sullivan
 Clair Global, an international sound reinforcement and event technology company
 CLAIRE, the Confederation of Laboratories for Artificial Intelligence Research in Europe, a European organization on artificial intelligence
 "Claire", an episode of American radio and television anthology series Screen Directors Playhouse 
 “Claire”, an episode of The Good Doctor 
 Claire (band), electronic-pop band using English lyrics from Munich, Germany
 Claire Redfield, a player character appearing in the Resident Evil series of survival horror video games
 Claire Bennet, a fictional character in the NBC science fiction drama series Heroes
 Clair Huxtable, a fictional character in the NBC sitcom The Cosby Show, portrayed by Phylicia Rashad
 Claire (2001 film), a fantasy film
 Claire (1924 film), a German silent film
 Claire (album), a 2002 album by Claire Sweeney
 Claire (programming language), an object-oriented programming language
 Claire's, a female accessory store
 Council of Local Authorities for International Relations (CLAIR), a Japanese government-affiliated foundation
 Claire (2007 film), a film written by Drew Seeley
 Clair, the cousin of Lance and eighth gym leader of Johto from Pokémon
 Clair, the younger sister of the Leader of the Zofian Liberation and the playable character in Alm's route from Fire Emblem Gaiden
 Claire Wyden, a character in the 2018 film Rampage

See also 
 Clair Lake (disambiguation)
 Clare (disambiguation)
 Clara (disambiguation)